The effects of Hurricane Isaac in Louisiana were more severe than anywhere in the storm's path, and included $611.8615 million in damages and five total deaths. Nearing the coast of Louisiana, the Category 1 hurricane slowly moved towards the west, making two landfalls in the state with little change of intensity prior to moving inland for a final time. The hurricane weakened and later dissipated on September 1 while over Missouri. Before landfall, Governor Bobby Jindal declared a state of emergency to the state, as well as ordering the mandatory evacuation of 60,000 residents in low-lying areas of Louisiana along the Tangipahoa River in Tangipahoa Parish.

The strong waves inundated large areas of the state's coastal regions, particularly in Plaquemines Parish. The hurricane also brought heavy rainfall, leading to severe inland flooding. Including adjacent states, the storm surge and inland flooding alone caused $407 million in insured losses. Isaac's strong winds caused infrastructural and crop damage, in addition to storm surge and heavy rains. A WeatherBug weather station in Poydras reported a  wind gust, the fastest measured in association with the storm. The strong winds also caused a widespread power outage, with 901,000 electricity customers losing power. In the aftermath of the hurricane, the Federal Emergency Management Agency (FEMA) granted $204.8 million in public assistance funds and $129.3 million in individual assistance funding.

Background

Hurricane Isaac originated from a tropical wave that moved off the western coast of Africa on August 17. Moving generally westward, the low-pressure area initially did not have a well-defined center until three days later. As a result, convection associated with the system organized and intensified, and the tropical wave quickly strengthened into a tropical depression. In favorable conditions, the depression was upgraded to Tropical Storm Isaac by the National Hurricane Center (NHC) on August 21. Quickly accelerating westward due to a subtropical ridge, Isaac later moved past the Lesser Antilles between Guadeloupe and Dominica by August 23, where it caused numerous mudslides and power outages. Maintaining tropical storm intensity, Isaac later made its first landfall on the southern coast of Haiti early on August 25 as a result of curving around the ridge of high-pressure. There the storm directly killed 24 people, worsening conditions still remaining after the 2010 Haiti earthquake.

Isaac later began to curve westwards due to wind patterns which brought it between two opposingly rotating cyclonic systems. After briefly moving into the Gulf of Gonâve, the tropical storm made a second landfall near Cajobabo, Guantánamo in Cuba at 1500 UTC later on August 25, where damages were comparatively less severe than in Haiti. The storm paralleled the northern coast of the island prior to making a close pass of Key West, Florida, where it caused minor flood damage across the Florida Keys and South Florida upon entry into the Gulf of Mexico. The threat of tropical cyclone impacts in Tampa, Florida forced the postponing of the 2012 Republican National Convention. In the gulf, the tropical storm curved to the northwest and attained hurricane strength on August 27 near the southern Louisiana coast. Another ridge of high pressure caused Isaac to move towards the west and slow down as it made two landfalls on the state. Once it moved inland, the hurricane weakened before dissipating over Missouri on September 1.

Preparations

The National Hurricane Center first began to issue tropical cyclone warnings and watches for areas of Louisiana at 0900 UTC on August 26, when a hurricane watch was issued for coastal areas of the state from the Mississippi River Delta eastward. The watch zone was later extended westward to Morgan City at 1500 UTC later that day. A second, unconnected hurricane watch was issued for coastal areas of New Orleans and Lake Pontchartrain at the same time. As Isaac moved closer to the coast, both watches were upgraded to hurricane warnings at 2100 UTC. Another hurricane warning was issued for Lake Maurepas at the same time. A tropical storm warning and hurricane watch was issued for coastal areas of Louisiana from Intracoastal City to Morgan City at 0900 UTC on August 27, with the watch later being upgraded to a warning. All tropical cyclone-related warnings remained in effect for the entire state coast for the duration of Isaac's passage. After the hurricane degenerated to a tropical storm at 1900 UTC on August 29, all hurricane warnings were discontinued. As Isaac moved further inland, active tropical storm warnings progressively began to cover a smaller region of the Louisiana coast before all tropical cyclone warnings were discontinued at 2100 UTC on August 30.

Upon the issuing of hurricane watches warnings, Louisiana Governor Bobby Jindal declared a state of emergency for the entirety Louisiana, recommending evacuation of areas unprotected by levees or areas south of the Intracoastal Waterway. Mayor of New Orleans Mitch Landrieu took the same course of action for his city. However, he stated that the Louis Armstrong New Orleans International Airport, convention center, and Mercedes-Benz Superdome would not be emergency shelters. Residents of Plaquemines Parish's eastern bank were ordered a mandatory evacuation on August 26, while a voluntary evacuation was ordered for southern areas of the parish from Ironton to Venice. In other regions of the parish, levees were lined with visqueen to protect exposed dirt, with sandbags being added to levees in other locations including Pointe à la Hache. Evacuation orders were also placed for visitors and tourists in Grand Isle on the same day, with residents ordered to evacuate on August 27. In St. Charles Parish and Terrebonne Parish, 73,000 residents were ordered to evacuate. FEMA began to deliver meals and tarpaulins to the state on August 28.

Impact

Shortly after the hurricane moved back over the Gulf of Mexico, prior to making a second landfall near Port Fourchon with little change in intensity. Afterwards, Isaac weakened over land, moving to the northwest across the state before exiting Louisiana at the state border with Arkansas.

Storm surge

At the coast, the system's large size generated a strong storm surge that caused extensive damage to low-lying areas of the state. The strong storm surge inundated areas of lower Louisiana. In eastern areas of the parish, water had accumulated from Breton Sound against a levee. The rising water levels later overtopped the levee height, causing it to overflow and inundate primarily uninhabited areas between Braithwaite and Belair. In nearby LaPlace, 5,000 homes were flooded by the surge. In Louisiana, storm surge and storm tide-related impacts caused $493.5 million in damages and three deaths.

Rainfall

Hurricane Isaac dropped heavy rainfall across the state, particularly in eastern areas of Louisiana, which caused flash flooding and river flooding. In La Salle Parish, the heavy rains forced several road closures. Street flooding also occurred in New Orleans. A strong rainband remained stationary over Rapides Parish, flooding several structures and causing $10,000 in damages.

Aftermath

Although only a category 1 hurricane, Isaac still caused an estimated $3.11 billion worth of damage along with a death toll of five people in the United States. 

A category 1 hurricane, like Isaac, has sustained winds of at least 74 mph and no more than 95 mph. However, with increasing development in coastal areas, the more deadly effect from hurricanes has been storm surge. Storm surge is the rise in water level caused by the winds forcing the water forward. In many parts of the Gulf Coast, it does not take very strong winds to create a potentially dangerous storm surge. Isaac made landfall near the mouth of the Mississippi River with sustained winds of 70kt (81 mph). This was enough to cause flooding in large areas of south Louisiana especially in St. Bernard, Orleans, Plaquemines, and St. Tammany Parishes where water height was as much as 10 to 12 feet above sea level. 

Besides for effects on populated areas, Isaac also had a dramatic effect on the wetlands and barrier islands of southern Louisiana which provide large amounts of biodiversity and offer numerous advantages to humans. The United States Geological Survey conducted multiple aerial surveys of landmasses specifically vulnerable to hurricanes. These surveys were done before and after Hurricane Isaac in order to provide a comparison. Photos of the Chandeleur Islands, a series of barrier islands off of the eastern coast of southern Louisiana, show significant erosion caused by wind and storm surge. Additionally, almost all of the pre-storm vegetation was lost.

Wetlands
Today, a common problem associated with wetlands and barrier islands is that once they have been eroded and reclaimed by the Gulf of Mexico, they are likely to permanently remain open water. Wetlands and barrier islands originally formed from sediment deposition from the southern Mississippi River system beginning approximately 5,000 years ago. The river would carry sediment down its path, and seasonal flooding of the river would allow sediment to be deposited in adjacent areas. Additionally, forming distributaries would let the Mississippi River branch off, reaching new areas, and thus form large amounts of wetlands. However, humans have modified the natural paths of rivers. This process, known as channelization, has serious consequences for wetland ecosystems which include drainage of wetlands, degradation of natural habitats, and elimination of natural flow patterns. With levees, canals, and set channels for water to flow through, the river no longer floods and reroutes naturally and seasonally. The river is not able to deposit sediment in diverse areas to help create wetlands. Instead, the river flows through its artificially determined path and deposits the valuable sediment off the edge of the continental shelf. This lack of natural wetland restoration combined with the continued erosion from hurricanes causes a rapid loss in wetland area. Before human channelization of waterways, the river's natural process of sediment deposition was enough to sustain the wetland habitat, but currently wetland area is on a downward trend. Since 1932, the Mississippi River Delta Basin has lost 70 percent of its land area. At this rate, it is predicted that less than 5 percent of the original land area from 1932 will exist in 2064. Additionally, levees and waterway barriers can trap storm surge and prevent proper draining. This oftentimes will cause long periods of severe flooding that has its own consequences for wetlands. For example, after Hurricane Rita in 2005, the enclosed marshes of Chenier plain were flooded for over nine months following the storm.

Recent levee systems
The Hurricane and Storm Damage Risk Reduction System(HSDRRS) was implemented by the Army Corps of Engineers after the devastation from Hurricane Katrina in 2005. The HSDRRS is a project aimed at completely re-engineering the levee system in New Orleans and surrounding areas in order to withstand effects from a "100 year storm," or a storm that has a one percent chance of occurring each year. The project includes construction of multiple floodgates around the city, redesigning pumping stations to pump water out of the city, and raising levees while constructing seawalls on top of them. The system's first real test came with the impact of Hurricane Isaac in late August 2012. Although Isaac was only a category 1 storm, the speed of Isaac's movement was considerably slower than most hurricanes, allowing more time for storm surge and damage to compile. Isaac produced tropical storm force winds for up to 45 hours while the effects of storms like Katrina and Rita only lasted for 21 and 16 hours, respectively. This suggests that even though Isaac was of lower intensity, the severity may have rivaled Katrina and Rita in certain locations. An analysis conducted by the US Army Corps of Engineers stated that the post-Katrina HSDRRS prevented potential flooding in areas within the strengthened levee, but potentially caused up to one foot of additional flooding in areas immediately outside of the HSDDRS.

See also

 2012 Atlantic hurricane season
 List of Louisiana hurricanes (2000–present)
 History of New Orleans

References

Notes

External links

 Hurricane Isaac: Assessing Preparedness, Response, and Recovery Efforts: Hearing before a Subcommittee of the Committee on Appropriations, United States Senate, One Hundred Twelfth Congress, Second Session: Special Hearing, September 25, 2012, Gretna, LA

Isaac
2012 in Louisiana
Isaac (2012)
Issac in Louisiana
Isaac Louisiana